Megabus is a long-distance intercity coach service operator owned by Scottish Citylink and based in the United Kingdom. Founded by Stagecoach Group (through Midland Red (South) Ltd) in August 2003, it operates using low-cost fares, formerly starting at £1, based on a yield management model. 

Services link 90 locations throughout the UK and carry over 4 million passengers a year. From 2012 until 2016, when these services were sold to FlixBus, the operator also ran routes to continental Europe. Some services link with Stagecoach-operated Megatrain value rail services.

History

2003 to 2005
Services from London to Oxford commenced on 4 August 2003, and from Edinburgh to Glasgow and Perth and Glasgow to Dundee were added one month later. During November 2003 routes from Manchester to Liverpool and Leeds were added, but these ceased on 27 June 2004 and 3 October 2004 respectively.

On 1 March 2004 a network of routes from London's Green Line Coach Station to Brighton, Portsmouth, Southampton, Bournemouth, Bristol, Exeter, Plymouth, Cardiff, Swansea and Birmingham were added.

On 28 June 2004 routes from London to Milton Keynes, Leicester, Chesterfield, Sheffield, Leeds, Manchester and Glasgow were added and within two months these were followed by the expansion of the Scottish routes to include Aberdeen and Inverness. Stagecoach West lost the contract to run the National Express route between London, Cheltenham and Gloucester, prompting it to introduce competing Megabus services from 5 September 2004.

On 6 September 2004 Stagecoach took over the Motorvator service between Edinburgh and Glasgow, selling a number of seats per journey through the Megabus site, the remainder being available without booking in advance, at regular fares. This enabled Stagecoach to cancel the dedicated Megabus service between the two cities. On 15 November 2004, the London to Oxford service was replaced by seats on the Oxford Tube.

On 31 January 2005, Stagecoach bus route X5 between Oxford and Cambridge became part of the Megabus network, selling a number of seats per journey in the same way as the Oxford Tube and Motorvator. From 18 April 2005, Nottingham, Worthing and Winchester were added to the network by slight extensions/modifications to existing routes, but rationalisation of the rest of the network took place, with some early morning and late evening services were withdrawn. On 13 June 2005 a new service was introduced between London and Coventry. However, the London to Swansea service was withdrawn between Cardiff and Swansea.

A joint venture between Scottish Citylink and Megabus led to co-ordination of services in Scotland. On 21 November 2005, the 900 Motorvator service was replaced by an enhanced Citylink service, with the facility to buy seats through the Megabus website was retained. The next week, most of the faster Citylink services between Aberdeen, Dundee, Perth and Glasgow, and Inverness, Perth and Edinburgh were replaced by a more frequent, combined Megabus/Citylink service. As a consequence, passengers who previously used parallel Citylink services from the bus station in Perth town centre were required to use Broxden Park & Ride on the outskirts of the town, with little to no onward connections to the town centre. Tickets for the combined Megabus/Citylink services are available through both companies' websites, though often at different prices.

From 16 February 2006, the slower Citylink service between Dundee, Perth and Glasgow became available to book through the Megabus website, restoring Perth bus station to the Megabus network. The same day of the Citylink service modifications, the London to Manchester route was extended to Preston, with some journeys extended to Blackpool or Lancaster. This coincided with the loss of National Express work at Preston depot. The extensions to Blackpool and Lancaster were short lived, and were withdrawn in February 2006, citing low passenger numbers. Following this Megabus tickets were sold on the Stagecoach in Lancashire X61 Blackpool to Manchester service, which was usually operated by a coach but this service was significantly slower than the equivalent National Express service.

Again following the loss of National Express contracts (this time at Stagecoach Warwickshire's Rugby depot), on 5 December 2005, the London to Birmingham service was increased in frequency to every two hours with an additional stop on the outskirts of Coventry, and the withdrawal of the direct once-a-day service to Coventry city centre. One journey a day in each direction was extended to Wolverhampton. The stops in the south of Birmingham were no longer served. Further changes on this day were the doubling of the London to Nottingham service to twice a day with one journey extended to Chesterfield (which regained the service lost in April 2005) and the introduction of a new once-daily service from London to Norwich.

2006 to 2009
A number of changes to routes were made on 27 March 2006. A direct service was introduced between Ferrytoll Park & Ride in Fife, Edinburgh and London via Newcastle and Sheffield. Together with changes to the Leeds to London services, this meant that changes at Tibshelf services were no longer needed. In addition, many routes had timetable changes. In particular, the London to Southampton and London to Portsmouth routes became feeders to the London to Bournemouth service, with passengers required to change at Winchester. Some London to Bristol journeys were extended to Cwmbran.
The London to Norwich and London to Wolverhampton and Chesterfield services were withdrawn on 14 May 2006
The London to Cheltenham service introduced an extra stop at Reading Coachway on 20 November 2006.
Early in February 2007, it was announced that the service between London, Milton Keynes, Leicester and Nottingham would be withdrawn on 11 March 2007. These services were restored Monday-Saturday following the acquisition of the East Midlands Trains franchise by Stagecoach, to and from London by Megatrain.
From 21 May 2007, services between London and Leeds were extended to Middlesbrough, Sunderland and Newcastle.

On 1 October 2007, the London hub moved from Bulleid Way to Victoria Coach Station.

From October 2009 M35 Cardiff to Newcastle began.

2010 to present

In May 2011, services were introduced between London and Norwich, Leeds and Edinburgh, and London and Swansea and Pembroke Dock with through ferry fares to Rosslare Europort in Ireland. Additional journeys were added to several existing routes.

From April 2012, Megabus began cross-nation services linking the UK to continental Europe, from Birmingham and London to Paris and from Leicester and London to Brussels and Amsterdam. This was announced a month prior to the introduction of the services. A third route, which operates entirely outside the UK, links Paris, Brussels and Amsterdam.

In 2013, Megabus started a route between Cologne, Brussels, Gent and London.

In 2014 Megabus launched a route between London, Paris, Toulouse and Barcelona. In Germany, as megabus.com GmbH, they also launched a route between Cologne, Frankfurt, Stuttgart and Munich.

On 24 June 2015, Megabus launched first intercity bus services in Italy with 22 coaches out of a depot in Bergamo. The five main routes are:
Turin-Venice stopping at Milan, Verona and Padua
Turin-Naples stopping at Milan, Bologna, Florence and Rome
Milan-Naples stopping at Bologna, Florence and Rome
Venice-Naples stopping at Padua, Florence and Rome
Milan-Rome west coast stopping at Genoa and Pisa

On 8 July 2015, a service commenced from Milan to London.

On 29 June 2016, Stagecoach Group announced that all operations in the European mainland, as well as those services linking London with Europe, had been sold to German competitor Flixbus from 1 July 2016 with Megabus serving as a contractor so no route changes were made. This left only domestic UK operations under the control of Stagecoach.

On 1 May 2017, Megabus commenced operating five services from London, Gatwick Airport and Heathrow Airport to the West of England. These were operated by South Gloucestershire Bus & Coach. Stagecoach purchased the South Gloucestershire Bus & Coach business in September 2019 and integrated it into its Stagecoach West subsidiary.

As of October 2017, Megabus have created a new M39 service, running from Aberystwyth to Birmingham, via Welshpool and Shrewsbury. This service is operated by Mid Wales Travel.

In March 2018 the Advertising Standards Authority banned Megabus from using adverts promising £1 fares as few seats were available at this price. Megabus' response was to withdraw the £1 fares altogether, leading some passengers to note that the ASA's decision has worked to the detriment of Megabus customers.

In August 2022, as part of the Stagecoach Group sale to DWS, it was agreed that Megabus' retail activities (the sale and marketing of tickets) would be sold to Scottish Citylink. An earlier proposed sale of Stagecoach to National Express would have seen Megabus sold in its entirety to ComfortDelGro. Scottish Citylink is a longstanding joint venture between Stagecoach Group and ComfortDelGro, which also took over Falcon at the same time. Contracts to operate Megabus services are still held mainly by Stagecoach subsidiaries.

Other services

Megatrain

Megatrain offers low-cost intercity train travel on some East Midlands Railway. Services are available Monday to Saturday only, with no service on Sundays or public holidays.

Megabusplus

Megabusplus services combine Megabus and Megatrain for through journeys. It was launched on 30 March 2009.

North of England
As at August 2019, Megabusplus services use coaches to East Midlands Parkway station, then Megatrain (East Midlands Railway) services to London St Pancras. Even though Stagecoach ceased operating rail services in August 2019, when East Midlands Trains was superseded by East Midlands Railway, as at May 2021, services continue to operate.

As at August 2019, services operated were:
Bradford via Huddersfield
Hull Paragon Interchange via Doncaster
Scunthorpe

Services previously operated from York, but ceased in 2017 when Megabus entered a through ticketing agreement with Yorkshire Coastliner.

South West England
Megabusplus services also used coaches to Southampton Airport Parkway station, then Megatrain (South West Trains) to Bournemouth.

In 2014, further Megabusplus services were launched using South West Trains services between London Waterloo and Honiton, then the following four coach routes from Honiton:
Honiton – Okehampton – Bude
Honiton – Collumpton – Tiverton – Barnstaple
Honiton – Exeter Airport – Newton Abbot – Torquay – Paignton – Totnes – Plymouth
Honiton – Launceston – Bodmin – St Austell – Truro – Penzance

Sleeper and Gold services

Overnight sleeper services were introduced on the London to Glasgow route in 2011 using Jonckheere Mistral articulated coaches with a flat bunk bed as well as a seat for each passenger.

Luxury Megabus Gold coaches were introduced from 8 July 2013 on selected sleeper services between London and Edinburgh/Aberdeen, as well as some day services. This sub-brand is in line with the upmarket Stagecoach Gold and Citylink Gold brands already used by Stagecoach subsidiaries. This service ended in May 2017, due to it being consistently loss-making, and the coaches are now only used on daytime services.

Megasightseeing

On 23 April 2018, Megabus, along with Stagecoach London, started operating three non-stop open top bus sight seeing routes in London under the Megasightseeing brand. Each trip on the route was approximately two hours long, and used a GPS activated pre-recorded 'guide'. The three circular routes, which ran hourly on the hour started from Tower of London, The London Eye, and Park Lane. Tickets for the service were pre-booked from the Megabus website, and cash was not accepted at the roadside, however, bookings could be made for a particular journey right up to the time of departure, subject to availability. Megasightseeing was the only non-stop sightseeing service in London. 

Each sightseeing trip on the service carried up to 44 passengers. By reducing the number of bookings per trip, a top deck seat could be guaranteed, something other sightseeing operators in London are unable to offer at the present time. 

Megasightseeing followed the same yield pricing model of traditional Megabus routes, where fares can start from as little as £1 plus booking fee. 

The buses initially used on the service were former East London and Selkent 2005/06 Alexander ALX400 bodied Dennis Tridents. These vehicles were refurbished and converted to open and part open top by Alexander Dennis. They were housed at Bow bus garage. To comply with the London low emission zone, all were replaced by Alexander Dennis Enviro400s in 2019.

For the first time since Megabus was founded, 'Sid' the Megabus mascot, was given a voice - which could be heard in the automatic commentary on the vehicles whilst they were in motion on the tour.

On 9 June 2018, a Megasightseeing bus strayed in to a demonstration in Trafalgar Square in support of far right leader Tommy Robinson. The bus was overtaken by protesters and a significant amount of damage occurred to the vehicle, resulting in it needing to be towed away.

In May 2021, Megasightseeing services were withdrawn and replaced by City Sightseeing services jointly operated by Stagecoach and Julià Travel on behalf of the company using the same Alexander Dennis Enviro400 vehicles used on the Megasightseeing service repainted into the City Sightseeing livery.

Tickets and fares
Advertised fares initially started at £1 with a 50p booking fee (raised to £1 in 2018), using a yield management model with the lowest fares offered for booking early and on less popular journeys. Typically, only the first six seats were sold at £1. As of 2018 however, the £1 fares have been withdrawn with references to them removed from the website and coach body advertising. Services often use out-of-town coachway interchanges to reduce delays caused by calling at interchanges in urban centres. Megatrain also follows the yield management model.

Tickets must be bought in advance via the Megabus website or by telephone, when passengers are given a reservation number that they show the driver when they board. The only services on which tickets can be bought on the vehicle are a small number of Scottish services.

Stop locations
Megabus serves many towns and cities. For service efficiency it sometimes uses coachway interchanges rather than urban bus stations (e.g.  Meadowhall Interchange rather than Sheffield Interchange).

United Kingdom
London: Victoria Coach Station
Liverpool: Liverpool One bus station
Manchester: Shudehill Interchange
Sheffield: Meadowhall Interchange
University of the West of England
Newcastle Upon Tyne: Central Library
Leeds: Leeds City bus station
Glasgow: Buchanan bus station
Leicester: Fosse Park
Aberdeen: Union Square bus station

Fleet
The Megabus fleet is normally easily identifiable, with the megabus.com name on the front and sides in yellow on a blue base and the Megabus logo on the left side of the coach (facing forward) and rear of the bus.

Accessible coaches are operated on routes between England and Wales, the M9 and M90 in Scotland, and the M20.

Vehicles are owned and maintained by various Stagecoach subsidiaries. When branded vehicles are unavailable other Stagecoach vehicles can be used or coaches hired in. Substitute vehicles used have been Dennis Trident 2 and Volvo Olympian double deckers, and Dennis Dart and  Volvo B10M single deckers. Stagecoach London double deckers from Leyton garage were often seconded to Megabus  until the sale of that company to Macquarie Bank. When using substitute vehicles, there may not always be an onboard toilet, and in such cases rest stops are made.

Some journeys are contracted to other operators using non-Megabus liveried vehicles, including Turners Coachways of Bristol, Tetleys of Leeds, Hamiltons of Uxbridge and Compass Royston from Stockton-on-Tees.

Fleet history

Initially, most routes used buses designed for short journeys that had neither toilet facilities nor luggage space, and each passenger was allowed only one bag.

To commence operations, 1990/91 built 3-axle 94 seat Alexander RH bodied Leyland Olympians were purchased from Hong Kong Citybus. Stagecoach had previously owned these buses when it owned Citybus from March 1999 until June 2003.

Three-axle Dennis Dragons were allocated to Manchester to Liverpool and Manchester to Leeds services, which ceased operations in 2004.

A number of mid-life Volvo B10M coaches temporarily operated various routes, mainly in the South of England, until sufficient Olympians had been prepared for service. Gradually, most of these coaches were taken off Megabus work and used by Stagecoach elsewhere. However, the type made a reappearance at the end of 2005, when they became the mainstays on the services from London to Birmingham and London to Nottingham/Chesterfield.

Newer 'high-frills' articulated coaches, with both toilets and reclining seats, were used for the longer journeys between London and Scotland, but these were replaced early in 2005. These coaches have since been refurbished and modified to include beds for an Overnight 'Sleeper' service between London and Glasgow started in late 2011, competing with the Caledonian Sleeper train.

In summer 2004, Stagecoach received a batch of Neoplan Skyliners for the Oxford Tube. This displaced 68-seat five-year-old double deck Jonckheere bodied MAN 24.350 HOCLNR-NL coaches, some of which were transferred to Megabus on cross-border services and on services within Scotland.

Stagecoach ordered another batch of Neoplan Skyliners, which entered service with Megabus in early 2005. These replaced the articulated coaches used between London and Scotland, and also Leyland Olympians on some other longer distance services.

In October 2006, Stagecoach ordered 45 Plaxton Panther bodied Volvo B12BT 15-metre 65 seat coaches. The three-axle coaches were the longest rigid vehicles in the UK on their introduction to service in February 2007, and the first of their kind to be built in Britain.

In September 2009, Megabus took delivery of four new Van Hool Astromega double-deck coaches, currently used between London and Scotland via Manchester 

In October 2011, Megabus started an overnight sleeper service with 24 seats and bunks, between London and Glasgow. In November 2011 it started running daily and has proved to be very popular. The coaches used were modified Volvo B10M articulated coaches with Jonckheere bodywork. Despite its popularity, Megabus withdrew this service in 2017.

In early 2013, Megabus introduced new Plaxton Elite i coaches, built upon the Volvo B11RT chassis, into the fleet, running mainly on routes M9, M20 and the 900 (on behalf of Scottish Citylink).

In March and April 2018, nine former Selkent and East London Alexander ALX400 bodied Tridents were refurbished by Alexander Dennis in preparation for the new Megasightseeing Tours in London.

Incidents
In March 2010, a Megabus vehicle on an overnight service hit the body of a woman who had jumped from a bridge onto the M74 motorway. The driver failed to stop at the scene and was later suspended.
In July 2012, a suspected terrorist was thought to be on board a Megabus service which was stopped by armed police on the M6 Toll motorway near Weeford, but it turned out to be a false alarm caused by smoke from an e-cigarette.
In June 2013, a Megabus vehicle caught fire on the M62 motorway near Rastrick. All passengers and the driver escaped without injury.

References

External links

Megabus.com website

Coach operators in the United Kingdom
Companies based in Perth, Scotland
Stagecoach Group bus operators in England
Stagecoach Group bus operators in Scotland
Transport companies established in 2003
2003 establishments in the United Kingdom